MFJ Enterprises, founded in 1972 by Martin F. Jue, is a manufacturer of a broad range of products for the amateur radio market.  They specialize in station accessories, such as antenna tuners and antenna switching equipment. MFJ now manufactures more amateur radio products than any other company in the world.

Representative products have been described in  QST Magazine and CQ Amateur Radio.

The initials "MFJ" in the company name are those of the founder, Martin F. Jue (ham radio callsign K5FLU).

Subsidiaries
MFJ owns five subsidiary companies:
Ameritron HF Amplifiers
Hy-Gain Antennas and Rotators
Mirage VHF/UHF Amplifiers
Vectronics
Cushcraft Amateur Antennas, an antenna manufacturer that has expanded outside amateur radio into RFID technology.

References

External links
 MFJ Enterprises

Amateur radio companies
Companies based in Mississippi
Electronics companies established in 1972
1972 establishments in Mississippi